Norman Powell Williams (1883–1943), known as N. P. Williams, was an Anglican theologian and priest. Educated at Durham School and at Christ Church, Oxford, he enjoyed a succession of appointments at that university: Fellow of Magdalen (1906), Chaplain of Exeter (1909), Lady Margaret Professor of Divinity and Canon of Christ Church (1927). In 1924 he was Bampton lecturer.

His 1924 Bampton Lectures were published in 1927 under the title The Ideas of the Fall and of Original Sin, which continues to be an influential source for students of original sin to this day and was included in Ronald W. Hepburn's 1973 entry on the "Cosmic Fall" in the Dictionary of the History of Ideas. Williams argued for a "transcendental" or "pre-cosmic fall" that occurred in the "life-force" and "during an 'absolute' time" prior to the "differentiation of life into its present multiplicity of forms and the emergence of separate species."

He served as the Lady Margaret's Professor of Divinity at Oxford, from 1927 until his death in April, 1943. Also in 1927, he became the Canon of Christ Church, Oxford. A collected edition of his works was published by Eric Waldram Kemp in 1954, entitled simply N. P. Williams. On the flap jacket of this edition, N. P. Williams was given this description:

Selected works
The Christian Doctrine of the Last Things, 11 December 1927
The Ideas of the Fall and of Original Sin (Bampton Lectures 1924), 1927
The Grace of God, 1930
Northern Catholicism; ed. by N. P. Williams & Charles Harris. London. S.P.C.K., 1933
Deaconesses and "Holy Orders", 1938Judicial Authority in the Church of England, 1940Sermons and Addresses, Compiled with a Memoir'', SPCK, 1954

References

Footnotes

Bibliography

Further reading

 
 

1883 births
1943 deaths
20th-century English Anglican priests
20th-century English theologians
Alumni of Christ Church, Oxford
Anglo-Catholic clergy
Anglo-Catholic theologians
English Anglican theologians
English Anglo-Catholics
Fellows of Exeter College, Oxford
Fellows of Magdalen College, Oxford
People from Durham, England
People from Oxford